Casekow is a municipality in the Uckermark district, in Germany.

Demography

References 

Localities in Uckermark (district)